Conservatorio Antonio Vivaldi (officially, Conservatorio Di Musica A. Vivaldi) is a Piedmont music conservatory located in Alessandria, Italy. The Abba-Cornaglia Room seats 50, while the Michele Pittaluga Auditorium seats 120. The school provides "medium and high level music education" for students who are commonly of the age 16 through 23.

References

External links
 Official website 

Music schools in Italy
Buildings and structures in Alessandria
Antonio Vivaldi